O'Quinn is a surname. Notable people with the surname include:

Danny O'Quinn, American professional stock car racer
John O'Quinn, American lawyer
John O'Quinn (football), American football player
Kyle O'Quinn, American professional basketball player
Terry O'Quinn, American actor

See also
O'Quinn, Texas, unincorporated community